Martin van Steen (born 8 November 1969) is a Dutch former road cyclist, who competed as a professional from 1993 to 2003.

Major results

1990
 1st Grand Prix de Waregem
 2nd Romsée–Stavelot–Romsée
1991
 Teleflex Tour
1st Stages 4 & 6
 1st Stage 5b Circuit Franco-Belge
 3rd Omloop Houtse Linies
1992
 1st Overall Teleflex Tour
1st Stage 3
 1st Hel van het Mergelland
 1st Stage 5 Tour de Liège
 2nd Overall Tour du Hainaut
1st Stage 5
 3rd Ronde van Noord-Holland
 3rd Seraing-Aachen-Seraing
1993
 1st Ronde van Overijssel
 1st Stage 4 Milk Race
 3rd Hasselt–Spa–Hasselt
 7th Paris–Tours
1994
 8th Binche–Tournai–Binche
 9th Kuurne–Brussels–Kuurne
 10th Paris–Tours
 10th Classic Haribo
1995
 10th Omloop van het Houtland
1996
 4th Nationale Sluitingprijs
 5th Omloop van het Waasland
 7th Le Samyn
1997
 3rd PWZ Zuidenveld Tour
 4th Kampioenschap van Vlaanderen
 4th Ronde van Overijssel
 8th Overall Circuit Franco-Belge
 8th Overall Olympia's Tour
1998
 3rd Omloop der Kempen
 4th Rund um den Flughafen Köln-Bonn
 5th Scheldeprijs
 7th Le Samyn
1999
 2nd Ronde van Drenthe
 9th Brabantse Pijl
2000
 3rd Dwars door Gendringen
 6th Schaal Sels
 8th Grand Prix de Denain
2001
 1st Omloop van het Waasland
 4th GP Rudy Dhaenens
 5th Nationale Sluitingprijs
 7th Dwars door Gendringen
 7th Veenendaal–Veenendaal
 9th Omloop van het Houtland
 10th Schaal Sels
2002
 1st Stage 2 Tour de Liège
 5th Road race, National Road Championships
 5th ZLM Tour
 5th GP Stad Vilvoorde
 6th Dwars door Gendringen
 8th Omloop van het Waasland
 9th GP Rudy Dhaenens
2003
 5th Beverbeek Classic

References

External links 

1969 births
Living people
People from Oosterhout
Dutch male cyclists
Cyclists from North Brabant